In the geometry of hyperbolic 3-space, the tetrahedron-octahedron honeycomb is a compact uniform honeycomb, constructed from octahedron and tetrahedron cells, in a rhombicuboctahedron vertex figure.

It represents a semiregular honeycomb as defined by all regular cells, although from the Wythoff construction, rectified tetrahedral r{3,3}, becomes the regular octahedron {3,4}.

Images

See also 
 Convex uniform honeycombs in hyperbolic space
 List of regular polytopes
 Tetrahedral-octahedral honeycomb - similar Euclidean honeycomb, 
 Tetrahedral-cubic honeycomb

References 
Coxeter, Regular Polytopes, 3rd. ed., Dover Publications, 1973. . (Tables I and II: Regular polytopes and honeycombs, pp. 294–296)
Coxeter, The Beauty of Geometry: Twelve Essays, Dover Publications, 1999  (Chapter 10: Regular honeycombs in hyperbolic space, Summary tables II,III,IV,V, p212-213)
 Jeffrey R. Weeks The Shape of Space, 2nd edition  (Chapter 16-17: Geometries on Three-manifolds I,II)
 Norman Johnson Uniform Polytopes, Manuscript
 N.W. Johnson: The Theory of Uniform Polytopes and Honeycombs, Ph.D. Dissertation, University of Toronto, 1966 
 N.W. Johnson: Geometries and Transformations, (2015) Chapter 13: Hyperbolic Coxeter groups

Honeycombs (geometry)